Kholoud Al-Saqqaf is the Jordanian Minister of Investment. She was appointed as ministers on 27 October 2022.

Education 
Saqqaf holds a Bachelor of Economics and Accounting (1984) and a Master of Economics and Statistics (1993) from the University of Jordan.

References 

21st-century Jordanian politicians
Jordanian politicians
Living people
Women government ministers of Jordan
Year of birth missing (living people)